A deme was a subdivision of Athens in ancient Greece.

Deme may also refer to:
 Deme, an alternative name for the municipalities of Greece (dhímos; pl. δήμοι, dhímoi)
 Dèmè, Benin
 Deme (biology), a local population of organisms of one species that actively interbreed with one another and share a distinct gene pool
 DEME, one of the largest dredging companies in the world
 Deme, an Iranian name for the Towers of Silence

People 
 Masanobu Deme (1932–2016), Japanese film director
 József Deme (born 1951), Hungarian Olympic sprint canoeist
 Imre Deme (born 1983), Hungarian football (soccer) player